The Indiana–Notre Dame men's soccer rivalry is a college soccer rivalry between the Indiana Hoosiers men's soccer team and the Notre Dame Fighting Irish men's soccer program. The two programs are two of the most successful college soccer programs in the state of Indiana.

History 
Historically, the rivalry has favored Indiana, who were dominate from the 1970s to the 1990s over Notre Dame. During this period of time, the Hoosiers and Irish played 22 matches against each other, with the Hoosiers having a 20–1–1 record over the Irish. Since the turn of the 21st century, the series has been much more competitive, as Indiana has a 11–10–1 advantage of Notre Dame.

Indiana began their varsity soccer program in 1973, while Notre Dame began theirs in 1977. The matches held in 1973 and 1974 were between Indiana's varsity team and the Notre Dame club team. For Notre Dame's records, the first match between the two programs was October 22, 1978 where Indiana won 7–1, while the first match in Indiana's records was September 14, 1973 where Indiana won 5–1. Indiana won the first ten matches of the series before Notre Dame earned their win in 1987.

In 1994, the programs met for the first time in the NCAA Division I Men's Soccer Tournament. The match, held in Bloomington, saw Indiana win 1–0 over Notre Dame.

Over the 2010s, the series has become seen as a more fierce rivalry, as players and coaches have called the match up between the two sides as an emotional affair. In 2018, Fred Glass, Indiana athletic director, called Notre Dame one of Indiana soccer's "biggest rivals".

On November 30, 2018 the programs met for the fifth time in the NCAA Tournament, where Indiana came out victorious, 1–0. The match was played in front of 5,159 fans, making it the eighth largest crowd in the history of Bill Armstrong Stadium.

Results

Honors

References

External links 
 IU Men's Soccer
 Notre Dame Men's Soccer

College soccer rivalries in the United States
Indiana Hoosiers men's soccer
Notre Dame Fighting Irish men's soccer
1973 establishments in Indiana
1977 establishments in Indiana